is a former Japanese football player.

Club career
Shirai was born in Fuji on 17 June 1974. After graduating from [high school, he joined his local club Shimizu S-Pulse in 1993. However his opportunity to play increased, he could hardly play in the match in 1996. He moved to Verdy Kawasaki (1997) and Cerezo Osaka (1998). After a year's blank, he joined J2 League club Shonan Bellmare in 2000. He played for Bellmare in 6 seasons. He moved to Vegalta Sendai in 2006. Initially he played as regular player. However he lost regular position for injury in June 2006. He moved to Japan Football League club FC Ryukyu in 2008. However he could hardly play in the match for injury. He retired end of 2008 season.

National team career
In July 1996, Shirai was selected Japan U-23 national team for 1996 Summer Olympics. At this tournament, he played 2 matches. Although Japan won 2 matches, Japan lost at First round. At this time, Japan won Brazil in first game. It was known as "Miracle of Miami" (マイアミの奇跡) in Japan.

Club statistics

References

External links

1974 births
Living people
Association football people from Shizuoka Prefecture
Japanese footballers
J1 League players
J2 League players
Japan Football League players
Shimizu S-Pulse players
Tokyo Verdy players
Cerezo Osaka players
Shonan Bellmare players
Vegalta Sendai players
FC Ryukyu players
Footballers at the 1996 Summer Olympics
Olympic footballers of Japan
Association football defenders